Montay Crockett (born December 11, 1993) is an American football wide receiver who is currently a free agent. He played college football at Georgia Southern. He was signed by the Green Bay Packers as an undrafted free agent in 2017.

College career
Crockett played college football for Georgia Southern University, appearing in 47 games with 18 starts, totaling 32 receptions for 535 yards and three touchdowns. He also had 15 carries for 144 yards and two touchdowns throughout his career.

Professional career

Green Bay Packers
Crockett signed with the Green Bay Packers as an undrafted free agent on May 5, 2017. He was waived by the Packers on September 2, 2017.

Jacksonville Jaguars
On October 30, 2017, Crockett was signed to the Jacksonville Jaguars' practice squad. He was promoted to the active roster on December 26, 2017. He was waived by the Jaguars on January 13, 2018.

Houston Texans
On January 23, 2018, Crockett was claimed off waivers by the Houston Texans. He was waived by the Texans on May 14, 2018.

Jacksonville Jaguars (second stint)
On June 6, 2018, Crockett signed with Jacksonville Jaguars. He was waived on September 1, 2018.

Arizona Cardinals
On November 7, 2018, Crockett was signed to the Arizona Cardinals practice squad. He was waived by the Cardinals on December 4, 2018.

Washington Redskins
On December 18, 2018, Crockett was signed to the Washington Redskins practice squad.

Atlanta Legends
In 2019, Crockett joined the Atlanta Legends of the Alliance of American Football.

Oakland Raiders
After the AAF ceased operations in April 2019, Crockett signed with the Oakland Raiders on June 11, 2019. On July 15, 2019, the Raiders waived Crockett.

Winnipeg Blue Bombers
Crockett signed with the Winnipeg Blue Bombers of the CFL on May 28, 2020. After the CFL canceled the 2020 season due to the COVID-19 pandemic, Crockett chose to opt-out of his contract with the Blue Bombers on September 3, 2020. He opted back in to his contract on January 8, 2021.

BC Lions
On January 18, 2022, Crockett signed with the BC Lions of the Canadian Football League (CFL). On June 5, 2022, Crockett was released by the Lions.

Alabama Airborne
On July 13, 2022, Crockett signed with the Alabama Airborne of Major League Football (MLFB). However the league disbanded before they ever played a game.

Green Bay Blizzard
On October 26, 2022, Crockett signed with the Green Bay Blizzard of the Indoor Football League (IFL). On February 21, 2023, Crockett refused to report to the Blizzard and became a free agent.

References

External links
Georgia Southern Eagles bio

1993 births
Living people
Players of American football from South Carolina
People from Rock Hill, South Carolina
American football wide receivers
Georgia Southern Eagles football players
Green Bay Packers players
Jacksonville Jaguars players
Houston Texans players
Arizona Cardinals players
Washington Redskins players
Atlanta Legends players
Oakland Raiders players
Winnipeg Blue Bombers players